For 1981 in television, see:

1981 in Albanian television
1981 in American television
1981 in Australian television
1981 in Austrian television
1981 in Belgian television
1981 in Brazilian television
1981 in British television
1981 in Canadian television
1981 in Chinese television
1981 in Croatian television
1981 in Czech television
1981 in Danish television
1981 in Dutch television
1981 in Estonian television
1981 in French television
1981 in German television
1981 in Greek television
1981 in Indonesian television
1981 in Irish television
1981 in Israeli television
1981 in Japanese television
1981 in New Zealand television
1981 in Philippine television
1981 in Scottish television
1981 in Singapore television
1981 in South African television
1981 in South Korean television
1981 in Thai television